Michael Shapcott is Executive Director of the Sorrento Centre, a retreat and conference centre in the Shuswap region of British Columbia, Canada, that offers in-person and on-line events and activities. Previously, he served as Director of National Business and Community Strategy for Prince's Charities Canada. 

He is a Canadian academic, advocate and activist whose public policy work focuses on housing, homelessness, and the relationships between health, poverty and housing, as well as human rights. He has worked on housing and homelessness initiatives at all levels of government including international levels. He has served as Director of the Affordable Housing and Social Innovation at the Wellesley Institute (WI),  a non-profit and non-partisan research and policy think tank in Toronto, Ontario, Canada. He was manager of the Community/University Research Partnerships (CURP) program at University of Toronto's Centre for Urban and Community Studies, where he promoted links between academic research and social justice. Shapcott is a founding member of the National Housing and Homelessness Network and the Toronto Disaster Relief Committee. He served on the board and as president of the Toronto Environmental Alliance. He also served on the global Board of the Habitat International Coalition. Shapcott was a founder of the Multifaith Alliance to End Homelessness in Toronto (2007). Prior to that, he was manager of government relations and communications at the Co-operative Housing Federation of Canada (Ontario Region).

Shapcott is a founding member and served as a board member of the Canadian Alliance to End Homelessness, which has emerged as a leading Canadian advocacy organization.

For the first decade of his working life, Shapcott was a print journalist, working as a reporter, columnist and editor at several Canadian newspapers - including the North Bay Nugget, the Oakville Journal Record and the Calgary Albertan.

Michael Shapcott went to Alexander Galt Regional High School (1970–1972) and took courses including political science at the University of Calgary (1980–1982) and then studied law at the University of Toronto (1983–1986). He did not go before the bar but instead began to work at the Christian Resource Centre as a homeless outreach worker and community and housing developer. He attended summer programming at the London School of Economics in 2008. Shapcott is completing a Master of Theological Studies at the Faculty of Divinity, Trinity College, University of Toronto (2016–current).

In 1989, Shapcott, Bart Poesiat and future Toronto mayor Barbara Hall created the Rupert Pilot Project to fund affordable housing initiatives which received substantial funding in the early 1990s from the Ontario government.

Shapcott came to public attention in the late 1980s and early 1990s for his work in BASIC Poverty Action Group which was the genesis for the Breads Not Circuses coalition which argued that the money being spent on Toronto's bid for the 1996 Summer Olympics could be better spent on housing. His detractors vilified him for helping compromise the city's bid for the 1996 Olympic Games.

In 2004 Shapcott entered electoral politics by running as the New Democratic Party's candidate in Toronto Centre in the 2004 federal election placing second to Liberal incumbent Bill Graham. He made his second attempt in the same riding in the 2006 federal election, increasing the NDP vote to its highest level ever in the riding.

Shapcott was ordained as a Deacon in the Anglican Church of Canada in the Diocese of Toronto in 2016. He is licensed to serve as a Deacon in the Diocese of Kootenay, in the Ecclesiastical Province of British Columbia and Yukon, Anglican Church of Canada.

Over the years, Shapcott has been appointed to and has served on governmental bodies at the federal, provincial and local level, including the Downtown Community Health Board, Toronto Board of Health (1990), the Corporate Minimum Tax Working Group of the Ontario Fair Tax Commission (1991) and numerous others, He continues to be active in governmental issues, most recently serving as an appointed member of the Columbia-Shuswap Regional District's Sorrento-Blind Bay Incorporation Advisory Committee (2019 - current).

Shapcott was awarded the first Terence and Alice Jean Finlay Bursary for studies that celebrate and advance diversity in Anglican Church, Diocese of Toronto (2017); and awarded Queen Elizabeth II Diamond Jubilee Medal for outstanding community service (2012).

Selected publications 

  In this often cited report, Shapcott uses a graphic entitled "Precarious housing iceberg" to represent the layers on the spectrum of precarious housing in Canada in 2010. Above the water line the visible iceberg represents the visible homeless (150-300,000) but below the water other layers on the spectrum of housing vulnerabilities include the hidden homeless (450,000-900,000), overcrowded (705,165 h/hs), substandard housing (1.3 million h/hs), core housing need (1.5 million h/hs), inadequate housing (2 million h/hs), annual housing supply deficit (220,000 h/hs) and unaffordable housing (3.1 million h/hs).
Co-author, with Jack Layton. Homelessness, How to End the National Crisis, Revised and Edited. 
Co-editor, with David Hulchanski, Finding Room: Policy Options for a Canadian Rental Housing Strategy

Citations

External links
Rupert Pilot Project
Wellesley Institute
Centre for Urban and Community Studies
Toronto Environmental Alliance
Coalition Against Israeli Apartheid
Toronto accordion gathering

Year of birth missing (living people)
Living people
Canadian anti-poverty activists
Canadian human rights activists
Canadian social work academics
Health activists
Homelessness activists
Housing reformers
New Democratic Party candidates for the Canadian House of Commons
Ontario candidates for Member of Parliament
Activists from Toronto
Social justice activists
Academic staff of the University of Toronto